Packaging Machinery Technology (ISSN-1556-1658) was a trade publication and web site owned by PMMI for packaging and packaging machinery manufacturers and packaging engineers in the United States and Canada.

Circulation was about 35,000 copies per issue. The editorial director was Sean Riley, with the editorial offices located in Paoli, Pennsylvania. In 2014, PMMI purchased Summit Media Group and all of its publications. PMT Magazine was rebranded as Packaging + Processing OEM Magazine in 2015. In 2017, it was rebranded again as OEM Magazine.

References

Bimonthly magazines published in the United States
Business magazines published in the United States
Defunct magazines published in the United States
Magazines established in 1963
Magazines disestablished in 2017
Magazines published in Pennsylvania
Packaging magazines and journals
Packaging machinery
Professional and trade magazines